Lochgelly, originally named Stewart, is an unincorporated community in Fayette County, West Virginia, United States. Lochgelly has a post office with ZIP code 25866.

The community was named after Lochgelly, in Scotland.

References

Unincorporated communities in Fayette County, West Virginia
Unincorporated communities in West Virginia
Coal towns in West Virginia